Jesse Moren Bader (1886–1963) was a 20th-century evangelist, ecumenist and global leader. He was a significant and visionary leader during the twentieth century, not only within his own communion, helping establish the World Convention of Churches of Christ but also within the wider church. This influence was not limited to the United States of America but extended to the Christian world.

Birth and Youth
Jesse Bader was born on April 15, 1886 in a log cabin in the small settlement of Bader, Illinois. His family was very involved in the Christian Church (Disciples) in Bader but when Jesse was just four years old his parents moved to Coffey County, Kansas where they bought a farm. Jesse lived on the farm until he was nineteen years old. His childhood and teen years included typical rural family, church and school involvement. In 1897, Clara H. Hazelrigg was ordained and subsequently was the pastor who converted Bader.

In 1905 he enrolled at the University of Kansas with plans to study medicine but instead he found a calling to ministry - partly as a result of his role as student minister in the nearby town of Perry. After two years of study he moved to Drake University in Des Moines, Iowa. Drake University was related to the Christian Church and provided for preparation for ministry.

Marriage
It was at Drake University that he met Golda Maud Elam whom he married in 1911, his last year at Drake. They were married for more than fifty years. Mrs. Bader, born September 6, 1885 to Edward E. and Lillie (Jones) Elam, died in February 1981. Their ministries were often very much a partnership but Mrs. Bader shouldered significant responsibilities of leadership of her own in United Church Women (now Church Women United) and the Protestant Motion Picture Council. She was also involved with Japan International Christian University and the American Bible Society. Mrs. Bader was an ordained minister and held associate pastor positions in two of the churches the Baders belonged to. There is no doubt that Jesse Bader's love and respect for his wife was a major reason for his encouragement of women to play a full and equal role in the church.

First Ministry
Jesse Bader's first full-time ministry was at First Christian Church, Atchison, Kansas. During his seven years here, the membership grew from around 300 to 1400. Dr. Bader emphasised the role of lay people in evangelism with the slogan, 'Each One Win One'. Here, in Atchison, he was member of the masonic Washington Lodge no.5, (see William Denslow - 10,000 Famous Freemasons, Macoy Publishing & Masonic Supply Co., Richmond, Virginia, 1957). He resigned from the church in Atchison in 1917, (at the time adding a member each day) when the USA entered World War I, to become a YMCA secretary with the armed forces. In 1918–1919 he served with the 35th Division in France and at the end of the war was one of several selected for a preaching mission amongst the American forces in Germany.

Jackson Avenue Christian Church
Back in the USA in 1920, Jesse became the pastor of Jackson Avenue Christian Church in Kansas City, Missouri which after his death was renamed Bader Memorial Christian Church. Coinciding with the beginning of this ministry and still in his early thirties, he drafted a proposal for a five-year evangelistic program ('Win a Million') for the International Convention of Disciples of Christ, the national assembly of Christian Churches in the USA and Canada at that time. He had clearly developed a passion for the centrality and priority of evangelism in the ministry of the church. 'What the Lord made primary,' (and this was a comment he became known for), 'we have no right to make secondary.'

Superintendent of Evangelism
That same year Jesse Bader became Superintendent of Evangelism in the newly established United Christian Missionary Society, a calling he filled for the next twelve years. He travelled constantly and extensively throughout the Christian Church (Disciples) family in the United States and Canada lifting up the evangelistic task of the churches. He also became the head of the major UCMS 'home missionary' program.

World Convention of the Churches of Christ
While Dr. Bader was working with the UCMS, his interest was growing in the Christian World Communion that he belonged to - the 'Stone-Campbell family'. This global family had churches with the same origins and traditions using the names 'Christian Churches', 'Churches of Christ' or 'Disciples of Christ'. Baptists, Congregationalists, Lutherans, Methodists and Presbyterians had all established global conventions and a means of cooperating or acting in a worldwide way. Jesse Bader had attended the meeting of the Baptist World Alliance in 1925 and began thinking about how this concept might develop for his Stone-Campbell family. He canvassed suggestions amongst leaders in several countries including Australia, Canada, New Zealand and the United Kingdom receiving strong support. In October 1930, with attendance from around the world, the first World Convention of Churches of Christ was held in Washington DC, USA. Up to 10,000 people attended and the program featured an afternoon tea at the White House hosted by the President and Mrs. Hoover. 'World Convention' was firmly established. Dr. Bader became the first president (1930–35) and was also appointed as the first general secretary, a post he held (part-time until his retirement) until his death. Conventions were held every five years until 1970 (though the pattern was interrupted by World War II) and currently continue every four years.

'While preaching unity to others, our churches the world around have too often neglected to practice unity and promote a closer fellowship amongst themselves,' Jesse wrote in 1930. It was a statement he was to repeat often. 'World Convention' or 'World Convention (Christian - Churches of Christ - Disciples of Christ)' (current names) is a permanent legacy from Dr Bader that is also a constant reminder that a movement that came into existence to emphasise that 'the church is essentially, intentionally and constitutionally one', must always tend to its own unity if it is not to be hypocritical in reminding the whole church that unity is the will of God, the prayer of Christ, the heart of the gospel and the hope of the world.

Department of Evangelism for the Federal Council of Churches of Christ in America
In 1932 Jesse moved from his denominational position to become Associate Executive Secretary of the Department of Evangelism for the Federal Council of Churches of Christ in America. The Executive Secretary was the widely respected Charles L. Goodell. Dr Goodell saw in Jesse a successor for himself in his retirement so proposed that he be invited to become his associate. Samuel McCrea Cavert, General Secretary of the Federal Council was to discuss it with Jesse and writes of his surprise at Jesse's hesitation. "I still have vivid memories of my conversation with him at a long-drawn-out breakfast in the Severin Hotel in Indianapolis. To my surprise, he had some hesitation in accepting the invitation. He needed assurance that the Federal Council would give evangelism enough emphasis to provide the best base for his enthusiasm. He was, however, quick to see the future possibilities in the united program that the Council could develop as an official agency of cooperating churches.' (Herald of the Evangel, p 18.)

For the next twenty-two years until his retirement, Jesse Bader continued in this position (and the similar position in the National Council of Churches of Christ in the USA which succeeded the Federal Council in 1950) providing inspired evangelistic leadership for the member churches and their local communities.

Influence
Evangelistic staffing of the Councils under Dr Bader's leadership increased from one full-time person to seven. It became, according to Daniel L Poling, ' the most dynamic and largest department' of the Federal Council. Evangelism certainly received 'adequate emphasis'. Denominational evangelistic leadership showed even more remarkable growth. In 1932 only two denominations (Presbyterian and his own) had full-time secretaries of evangelism. In 1956 Dr Bader recorded that there were forty-six secretaries of evangelism in 35 Protestant communions. Evangelism had become central in the life of the churches.

His influence might be measured by the number of significant inter-church nationwide programs he led. He always had one major evangelistic thrust under way - a dozen in his time - programs such as the National Preaching Mission, the University Christian Mission, the National Christian Teaching Mission, ministry in National Parks (where visitor numbers increased to 15 million each year in the 1950s) and the missions to the American Forces during World War II. Local cooperation amongst churches grew significantly through this time in contrast with earlier more competitive denominationalism - another achievement that Jesse Bader can take much of the credit for..

Contributions to the Evangelistic Life of Churches
'Visitation evangelism' was a method of sharing the gospel and discipling that had been in effect for some time in the twentieth century, with many denominational leaders contributing to its development. (It could even be claimed that it was established by Jesus himself.) Because it was so successful the Department of Evangelism of the Federal Council of Churches adopted it officially and commended it to all churches. Visitation evangelism stressed the need for all Christians (ministers and lay people) to be involved in sharing their faith and it provided a natural, but very intentional, means of achieving this. In 1946-47 in particular a special emphasis was placed on this form of witness. Visitation not only added to the church, it strengthened the faith of those members taking part. Because visitation evangelism was interdenominational, it also gave the church a further sense of its God given unity.

Another significant contribution made by Jesse Bader to the evangelistic life of the churches was the religious census. Dr. Bader believed that it was essential to know people's church preference. He was certain this needed to be obtained by churches working together visiting house to house. The technique he perfected required careful processes and months of preparation. The results, in a society that was becoming much more mobile, needed to be used quickly.

The Annual Universal Week of Prayer (now Week of Prayer for Christian Unity) held in January, also received Jesse Bader's vital interest and encouragement. In the USA his Department sponsored this emphasis. He believed that churches in local communities could do no better than begin the year by sharing fellowship and prayer. Prayer would provide the focus for all that was planned.

Although Jesse recognised (and so did the evangelists themselves) that large revival meetings were not the most effective form of outreach they nevertheless received his support. Jesse Bader was a friend and consultant for the young Billy Graham and his team. Dr Bader was proud of the transparency of the public accounting of the Graham organisations.

World Communion Sunday
Jesse Bader will always be recognised as the founder of the global, ecumenical, World Communion Sunday which was launched on October 6, 1940 and continues on the first Sunday in October. Dr. Bader was aware of the Worldwide Communion Sunday of the Presbyterian Church, first celebrated in 1936, which was designed to strengthen Presbyterian global fellowship. During 1939 he brought a recommendation to the Department of Evangelism of the Federal Council of Churches, proposing the observance of a world wide, church wide communion Sunday. The recommendation was approved. Although the World Council of Churches felt unable to take up promotion of this project, Henry Smith Leiper, who was Associate General Secretary when the World Council was in process of formation, send out many letters encouraging participation. This was doubtless of considerable help in establishing World Communion Sunday globally. The emphasis of World Communion Sunday has never been on combining services for communion (something that is still not possible in many situations) but rather on all churches and congregations celebrating communion on that day, aware of their unity in Christ within the whole Christian family.

Leadership
Leadership of the World Convention of Churches of Christ (involving many international visits) and World Communion Sunday both lend support to any claim that Jesse Bader was a global Christian. But there was more than that. From 1937 onwards he attended all the major ecumenical gatherings related to the formation and establishment of the World Council of Churches including Oxford and Edinburgh (1937), Amsterdam (1948), Evanston (1954), New Delhi (1961) and the annual meetings of the World Council of Churches executive committee once it was set up in 1948. In 1962, on behalf of the World Convention, he represented the global family of Churches of Christ/Disciples of Christ at the Vatican Council.

Book
During 1956, two years after his retirement (December 31, 1953), Jesse Bader wrote his first and only book - Evangelism in a Changing America (The Bethany Press, 1957.) In the introduction, David S. McNelly wrote, 'He has outthought, outworked and outloved his contemporaries, to turn the tide of religion in America towards a great revival. His passion for evangelism, his zeal for ecumenicity, his compassion for the misguided, and his love on behalf of the unlovely, as well as his concern for the unconcerned, has excelled in every circle on the American scene. Dr Bader has moved across America and many kindred nations in the last quarter of a century, breathing the evangelistic spirit of life into the church, making bold the Great Commission of Jesus Christ. ... today many patterns of evangelism used by the American church were pioneered, perfected and promoted first by Dr. Bader. He … has done as much as any living man to establish a climate for evangelism in America today.' Before his time, Jesse Bader had seen that evangelism and ecumenism went hand in hand and were certainly not mutually exclusive. His final chapter, Evangelism Together, stresses that although there is a place for churches to focus on their own evangelism, some evangelism must be done together. Jesse Bader wrote this out of his experience.

Retirement
Following his official retirement at the end of 1953, he became full-time General Secretary for the World Convention of Churches of Christ, a 'spare time' activity since 1930. In the week of his death he had expected to be in San Juan, Puerto Rico, preparing for the 1965 World Convention there. He died, after a brief illness, in New York City, on August 19, 1963. He was 77. His funeral was held at First Christian Church, Atchison, Kansas. An interdenominational memorial service was held at The Interchurch Center in New York and many other memorial services were held in Christian Churches around the United States. His death was also marked at the next World Convention in Puerto Rico in 1965. Appropriately the permanent lecture series World Convention established in his name is entitled, 'The Bader Lectures in Evangelism'.

Bibliography
Herald of the Evangel, edited by Edwin T. Dahlberg. (Essays in a memorial volume.)
 
Evangelism in a Changing America, by Jesse M Bader
Convention handbooks (World Convention).

References

1886 births
1963 deaths
People from Schuyler County, Illinois
People from Coffey County, Kansas
American members of the Churches of Christ